WICO-FM (101.1 FM) is a radio station licensed to Snow Hill, Maryland, United States. The station serves the Delmarva Peninsula. The station is currently owned by A. Wray Fitch and Greg Bojko, through licensee GSB Media, LLC.

History
From approximately 2000 through the end of 2010, 101.1 was WQMR, a talk radio station. Programming on WQMR included  The Radio Factor, The Sean Hannity Show, Mark Levin, Dennis Miller, and Imus in the Morning, with a local show, Power Talk, filling the late morning time slot. When that format ended on January 10, 2011, the station began a prolonged stretch, one that continues to this day, of changing formats every few months, often trading formats with sister stations such as FM 105.1, AM 1590, AM 1280 and FM 87.7. Jack FM adult hits, gospel, Nash Icon country music, mainstream/alternative rock, and The True Oldies Channel have been among the numerous formats that have briefly aired on the station since 2011.

The most recent format change was November 28, 2017. Since then, it has simulcast WOWZ-FM 99.3 Accomac, VA, branded as "Wow 99.3 & 101.1".

References

External links
GSB Media Website

ICO-FM
2004 establishments in Maryland
Radio stations established in 2004
Classic country radio stations in the United States